Mudcrutch was an American southern and country rock band from Gainesville, Florida. They are best known for being the band that began Tom Petty's rise to fame.

Mudcrutch formed in Gainesville in 1970 and soon became a popular act across Florida. The band moved to Los Angeles in 1974 to attract the attention of a record company. Though they signed a contract with Shelter Records, they released only one poor-selling single before breaking up in 1975. The following year, former Mudcrutch members Petty, Mike Campbell, and Benmont Tench formed the core of a new band, the Heartbreakers.

Most of the original Mudcrutch lineup reformed in 2007 to record their first album as a group, which was followed by a tour. A second album followed in 2016. Petty's death in 2017 effectively dissolved the group again.

History

1970–1975 
Mudcrutch was formed in 1970 by teenage Gainesville, Florida residents Tom Petty and Tom Leadon, who had been playing together in a group called the Epics. Mudcrutch's lineup consisted of Petty (bass and vocals), Leadon (guitar and vocals), Jim Lenehan (vocals), Randall Marsh (drums) and Mike Campbell (guitar). This incarnation of the band issued a locally distributed single ("Up In Mississippi"/"Cause Is Understood") in 1971, with Petty writing and singing both songs. Leadon and Lenehan left the band in 1972 and were replaced by bassist/guitarist/vocalist Danny Roberts and keyboardist Benmont Tench. Ricky Rucker was a part of the band for a short time. Mudcrutch became locally popular and regularly played gigs from central Florida to southern Georgia. In Gainesville, they had a long stint as the house band at Dub's Lounge and organized several well-attended music festivals at "Mudcrutch Farm", a run-down house on a large lot where several band members lived.

In 1974, the members of Mudcrutch decided to relocate to Los Angeles to try to sign with a major record label. After several rejections, they signed with Leon Russell's independent Shelter Records. The band released one single, "Depot Street" in 1975, which failed to chart. After Danny Roberts left the group, Petty invited Charlie Souza to take over on bass guitar and the band continued recording in Leon Russell's Tulsa studio, and later at his Encino, California home. Discouraged by the group's lack of success, the record company broke up Mudcrutch in late 1975, keeping only Petty under contract. Several months later, Petty regrouped with former Mudcrutch members Mike Campbell and Benmont Tench to form The Heartbreakers along with fellow Gainesville natives Stan Lynch (drums) and Ron Blair (bass).

Reformation: 2007–2017 
In August 2007, Tom Petty invited Randall Marsh and Tom Leadon, original members of Mudcrutch, to reunite with Heartbreakers Benmont Tench and Mike Campbell to reform Mudcrutch. They recorded an album, Mudcrutch, which was released on April 29, 2008, by Reprise Records, and contains 14 old and new tracks. "We would play and then we would just talk about the old days," said Leadon. The band toured briefly in California to promote the album throughout April and the beginning of May 2008. The album hit number 8 on the Billboard 200 albums chart.

Fans who bought tickets to the tour through Ticketmaster were given six free downloads from the album.

On November 11, 2008, a live EP titled Extended Play Live was released. All tracks were recorded live in April 2008. On the same day American music channel VH1 Classic broadcast a documentary about the band.

According to Rolling Stone, Mudcrutch intended to reconvene August 2015 to begin work on a new album. The group was originally going to begin work on the album in January of that year, but things were pushed back eight months due to medical issues that rhythm guitarist Tom Leadon was experiencing. In February 2016, prior to the announcement that they were releasing a second album, Mudcrutch was announced as a headliner for both the 2016 Bunbury Music Festival in Cincinnati, Ohio, and the 2016 Summer Camp Music Festival in Chillicothe, Illinois.

The band's second full-length album, 2, was released May 20, 2016, on Reprise Records. Preceding the album's release was a single, "Trailer", as well as "Beautiful World" and "Hungry No More". The album hit number 10 on the Billboard 200 albums chart. Less than three days after the album was released, the band embarked on their first national tour in support of the album. The tour began the same way their 2008 tour did: with two benefit shows for the Midnight Mission (on May 23 and 24, 2016, in Los Angeles). Herb Pedersen, who is also credited on 2, joined Mudcrutch on the tour.

Tom Petty died on October 2, 2017, of cardiac arrest.

Personnel 
Band members
 Tom Petty – bass (1971–1974, 2007–2017), backing vocals (1971–1973, 2007–2017), lead vocals, harmonica (1973–1975, 2007–2017), rhythm guitar (1973–1975), keyboards (1971–1973)
 Mike Campbell – lead guitar (1971–1975, 2007–2017), occasional lead vocals (2015–2017)
 Benmont Tench – keyboards, backing vocals (1973–1975, 2007–2017), lead vocals (2007–2017)
 Randall Marsh – drums (1971–1975, 2007–2017), occasional lead vocals (2015–2017)
 Tom Leadon – rhythm guitar, backing vocals (1971–1972, 2007–2017), lead vocals (2007–2017)
 Jim Lenahan – lead vocals (1971–1972)
 Danny Roberts – rhythm guitar, bass, backing vocals (1973–1974)
 Charlie Souza – bass (1974–1975)

Timeline

Discography

Albums 
 2008: Mudcrutch
 2016: Mudcrutch 2

Live albums 
 2008: Extended Play Live
 2017: The Very Best Performances from the 2016 Mudcrutch Tour

Singles 
 1971: "Up in Mississippi Tonight" b/w "Cause Is Understood" (Pepper 9449)
 1975: "Depot Street" b/w "Wild Eyes" (Shelter SR-40357)
 2008: "Scare Easy" (March 25, 2008)
 2016: "Trailer" (March 25, 2016)
 2016: "Hungry No More"
 2016: "I Forgive It All"
 2017: "How Much Do You Need" (SiriusXM Exclusive)

Music videos 
 2008: "Scare Easy"
 2008: "Lover of the Bayou"
 2016: "I Forgive It All"
 2019: "Crystal River"

Also appears on 
 1995: Playback (box set compilation by Tom Petty and the Heartbreakers)
 2018: An American Treasure (box set compilation by Tom Petty and the Heartbreakers)
 2019: The Best of Everything (compilation album by Tom Petty and the Heartbreakers)

References

External links 
 
 Ultimate Classic Rock – New album information
 Mudcrutch in 2008 – Coverage and photos of Mudcrutch's return.

1970 establishments in Florida
2017 disestablishments in Florida
American country rock groups
Southern rock musical groups from Florida
Musical groups from Gainesville, Florida
Musical groups established in 1970
Musical groups disestablished in 1975
Musical groups reestablished in 2007
Musical groups disestablished in 2017
Tom Petty
Reprise Records artists